Bhagwati Prasad (died 9 July 2013) was an Indian politician who was elected MLA of Uttar Pradesh Legislative Assembly twice from Ikauna constituency.  He represented the Bharatiya Jana Sangh Party from 1967–69 and 1969–74. He had a very honest reputation and died in poverty after his family struggled to pay medical costs.

References

Year of birth missing
2013 deaths
Deaths from multiple organ failure
Bharatiya Jana Sangh politicians
Uttar Pradesh MLAs 1967–1969
Uttar Pradesh MLAs 1969–1974